The 20th Ryder Cup Matches were held at Muirfield in Gullane, East Lothian, Scotland.
The United States team won the competition by a score of 19 to 13 points. For the first time, what had previously been the "Great Britain" team was called "Great Britain and Ireland", although golfers from the Republic of Ireland had played since 1953, and from Northern Ireland since 1947.

Muirfield had hosted the Open Championship the previous year, won by American Lee Trevino.

Format
The Ryder Cup is a match play event, with each match worth one point.  The competition format was adjusted slightly in 1973 from the format used from 1963 through 1971:
Day 1 — 4 foursomes (alternate shot) matches in a morning session and 4 four-ball (better ball) matches in an afternoon session
Day 2 — 4 foursome matches in a morning session and 4 four-ball matches in an afternoon session
Day 3 — 16 singles matches, 8 each in morning and afternoon sessions
With a total of 32 points, 16 points were required to win the Cup.  All matches were played to a maximum of 18 holes.

Teams
Source: 

Due to the rules of the PGA of America in place at the time, players with less than five years as a professional were not eligible for the U.S. team, which included reigning U.S. Open champion Johnny Miller and Lanny Wadkins. (These rules also kept Jack Nicklaus on the sidelines until 1969.) Miller made his Ryder Cup debut in 1975 and Wadkins in 1977.

Thursday's matches

Morning foursomes

Afternoon four-ball

Friday's matches

Morning foursomes

Afternoon four-ball

Saturday's matches

Morning singles

Afternoon singles

Individual player records
Each entry refers to the win–loss–half record of the player.

Source:

Great Britain and Ireland

John Garner did not play in any matches.

United States

References

External links
PGA of America: 1973 Ryder Cup 
About.com: 1973 Ryder Cup

Ryder Cup
Golf tournaments in Scotland
Sport in East Lothian
Ryder Cup
Ryder Cup
Ryder Cup